Aamir Ghaffar (born 18 August 1979 in Peshawar) is a Pakistani badminton player who competed professionally for England.

He is most famous for winning the Canadian Open in 2004 and the men's singles title at the English National Badminton Championship in 2004 and 2005 and reached the final in 2008.

His notable achievements are his victories over 2004 Olympic silver medalist Shon Seung Mo of Korea at the World Championships 2005 in California, World No. 5 Bao Chunlai at the All England Open 2004 and World No. 8 Dicky Palyama at All England Open 2005. He won a silver medal at the Melbourne 2006 Commonwealth games in the team events.

Aamir reached world no. 21 at his peak and currently trains students at Isleworth and Syon School for Boys. He also trained the Afghan player Abdul Jalil. In 2008, Ghaffar released his own footwork video called "Aamir Ghaffar, Its all about the recovery" in which he demonstrates how to improve the Badminton footwork and how the top players make it look so easy on the court. He is currently training boys at the Dome Silver Performance centre, Hounslow. He is currently in a comeback, having won the Oxford Senior Silver Singles Event.

References

External links
 
 

1979 births
Living people
English male badminton players
Badminton coaches
Commonwealth Games silver medallists for England
Badminton players at the 2006 Commonwealth Games
Racket sportspeople from Peshawar
Pakistani emigrants to the United Kingdom
Commonwealth Games medallists in badminton
Medallists at the 2006 Commonwealth Games